Itamar Schülle (born 8 April 1967) is a Brazilian football manager and former player who played as a forward.

Since 2002 Schülle has coached Alto Vale, Nacional de Rolândia, Juventus-SC, Metropolitano, Figueirense, São Carlos, Joinville, Rio Branco de Paranaguá, São Luiz de Ijuí, Brasil de Pelotas, Criciúma, Botafogo da Paraíba, Pelotas, São José-RS, Brusque, Novo Hamburgo, Chapecoense, Santo André, Novo Hamburgo and Caxias.

However, Schülle's greatest achievement was with Operário Ferroviário where he won the Campeonato Paranaense in 2015, where Operário beat Coritiba over two games in the final, with an aggregate margin of 5 to 0.

Honours

Player
 Brusque
 Campeonato Catarinense: 1992
 Copa Santa Catarina: 1992

Manager
 Operário Ferroviário
 Campeonato Paranaense: 2015

 Botafogo da Paraiba
 Campeonato Paraibano: 2017

 Cuiabá
 Campeonato Mato-Grossense: 2018, 2019

References

External links
 Profile at Grande Área 

1967 births
Living people
Sportspeople from Santa Catarina (state)
Brazilian footballers
Brazilian football managers
Campeonato Brasileiro Série B managers
Campeonato Brasileiro Série C managers
Campeonato Brasileiro Série D managers
Association football forwards
Brusque Futebol Clube players
Grêmio Esportivo Juventus managers
Clube Atlético Metropolitano managers
Figueirense FC managers
São Carlos Futebol Clube managers
Joinville Esporte Clube managers
Rio Branco Sport Club managers
Esporte Clube São Luiz managers
Grêmio Esportivo Brasil managers
Criciúma Esporte Clube managers
Botafogo Futebol Clube (PB) managers
Esporte Clube Pelotas managers
Esporte Clube São José managers
Brusque Futebol Clube managers
Esporte Clube Novo Hamburgo managers
Associação Chapecoense de Futebol managers
Esporte Clube Santo André managers
Sociedade Esportiva Recreativa e Cultural Brasil managers
Operário Ferroviário Esporte Clube managers
ABC Futebol Clube managers
Cuiabá Esporte Clube managers
Vila Nova Futebol Clube managers
Santa Cruz Futebol Clube managers
Paysandu Sport Club managers